The 1917 Copa de Honor Municipalidad de Buenos Aires was the final that decided the champion of the 12th. edition of this National cup of Argentina. In the match, held in Independiente Stadium in Avellaneda, Racing Club beat Club Atlético River Plate 3–1 in extra time, winning its four Copa de Honor trophy within five years.

It was the 4th. and last Copa de Honor won by Racing, which also won all the finals contested.

Qualified teams 

Note

Overview 
The 1918 edition was contested by 29 clubs, 21 within Buenos Aires Province, and 8 from Liga Rosarina de Football. Playing in a single-elimination tournament, Racing beat Banfield (3–0 in Avellaneda), Estudiantes de La Plata (2–0 as visitor), arch-rival Independiente (3–1 after extra time in Crucecita stadium). In the Buenos Aires' semifinal, Racing beat San Lorenzo de Almagro 3–1 at Dársena Sur, qualifying to play the semifinal vs the Rosario representatives that had played another elimination stage. In semifinal, Racing defeated Rosario Central (1–1 and 3–0 in Dársena Sur and Crucecita, respectively).

On the other hand, River Plate beat Estudiantil Porteño (3–0 at Gaona and Campichuelo), Porteño (2–0 in Dársena Sur), Tigre (5–0 as visitor), and finally Huracán (3–2 at Racing Club) qualifying for the semifinal vs the Rosarian team, where the squad beat Tiro Federal (1–1 and 1–0, at Gimnasia y Esgrima de Rosario and Dársena Sur, respectively).

The final was held in Independiente Stadium, popularly known as La Crucecita on January 6, 1918. Racing beat River 3–1 after extra time, winning its four and last Copa de Honor trophy.

Match details

References

m
m
1917 in Argentine football
Football in Avellaneda